"Who Knows Where the Time Goes?" is a song written by the English folk-rock singer and songwriter Sandy Denny. Denny originally recorded the song as a demo in 1967, singing and playing guitar on the track. Later that year, she briefly joined the folk band The Strawbs, and re-recorded the song, again with only her voice and guitar, for what became the album All Our Own Work, which was not released until 1973.

The American folk singer Judy Collins heard a tape of the original demo recording in 1968 and decided to cover the song. She released her recording first as the B-side of her version of "Both Sides, Now", and then as the title track of her album Who Knows Where the Time Goes, both released in 1968. Hers was the first widely available recording of the song.

In 1968, Denny joined the folk-rock band Fairport Convention. She recorded the song on her second album with the band, the 1969 album Unhalfbricking. This version had more of a rock influence.

"Who Knows Where the Time Goes?" became a signature song for both Denny and Fairport Convention, and has been covered by many artists.

In 2007, the Unhalfbricking version was voted "Favourite Folk Track Of All Time" by listeners of BBC Radio 2.

Structure
The song is a slow-paced reflection in three verses on observed events ("Across the evening sky all the birds are leaving") Having described these observations, Denny then writes that, for her, some things are timeless ("Before the winter's fire, I will still be dreamin'; I have no thought of time") and in the last line of the short chorus asks rhetorically, "Who knows where the time goes?".

Cover versions

Cover versions have been recorded by, among others, Mia Doi Todd, 10,000 Maniacs, Mary Black, Eva Cassidy, Judy Collins, Nana Mouskouri, Lonnie Donegan, Renée Fleming (with Brad Mehldau), Nanci Griffith, Susanna Hoffs and Matthew Sweet, Deanna Kirk, Charlie Louvin, Cat Power, Eddi Reader, Julianne Regan (with Fairport Convention), Kate Rusby, Nina Simone (on her 1970 live album Black Gold), Barbara Dickson, Kate Wolf, Lumiere w/Sinéad O'Connor, The Lasses, Heather Masse (on the radio program A Prairie Home Companion), Dez Mona, Itsuwa Mayumi and Sissel Kyrkjebø.

In popular culture
The Fairport Convention version was used as the closing music for the 2017 final episode of the Netflix series Grace and Frankie; in the BBC's Inspector George Gently episode "The Lost Child" set in 1968; in the second series of the successful British dark comedy-drama series The End of the F***ing World; and in the "One Giant Leap" episode of the NBC family drama This Is Us. It is also played once at the end of the 2009 film Don't Worry About Me and twice in the 2012 Irish film Silence. In the 2011 Broadway production of Jerusalem by Jez Butterworth, the live recording from BBC Radio Sounds of the Seventies, recorded on 11 September 1973, is played in its entirety towards the end of the final act.
Fairport Convention'''s version is also used in a season 2 episode of Stath Lets Flats (2019).

Eva Cassidy's cover version was featured in Season 1 Episode 10 of the Netflix drama Firefly Lane.

The Judy Collins version can be heard in the 1968 film The Subject Was Roses and in the 1999 film A Walk on the Moon while the Nina Simone version is used in the 2002 film The Dancer Upstairs, in the 2018 British TV series Save Me, and season 3 of Master of None''.

References

1967 songs
Fairport Convention songs
Judy Collins songs
Nina Simone songs
Sandy Denny songs
Songs written by Sandy Denny
Matthew Sweet songs